Krishnadevaraya (17 January 1471 — 17 October 1529) was an emperor of the Vijayanagara Empire reigning from 1509 to 1529. He was the third monarch of the Tuluva dynasty, and is considered to be one of the greatest rulers in Indian history. He ruled the largest empire in India after the decline of the Delhi Sultanate. Presiding over the empire at its zenith, he is regarded as an icon by many Indians. Krishnadevaraya earned the titles Andhra Bhoja (lit. "Bhoja of Andhra"), Karnatakaratna Simhasanadeeshwara (lit. "Lord of the Jewelled Throne of Karnataka"), Yavana Rajya Pratistapanacharya (lit. "Establishment of the King to Bahmani Throne"), Kannada Rajya Rama Ramana (lit. "Lord of the Kannada Empire), Gaubrahmana Pratipalaka (lit. "Protector of Brahmins and Cows") and Mooru Rayara Ganda (lit. "Lord of Three Kings"). He became the dominant ruler of the peninsula by defeating the sultans of Bijapur, Golconda, the Bahmani Sultanate and the Gajapatis of Odisha, and was one of the most powerful Hindu rulers in India.

Krishna Deva Raya's rule was characterised by expansion and consolidation. This was the time when the land between the Tungabhadra and Krishna river (the Raichur doab) was acquired (1512), ruler of Odisha were subdued (1514) and severe defeats were inflicted on the Sultan of Bijapur (1520).

When the Mughal Emperor Babur was taking stock of the potentates of north India, he rated Krishnadevaraya the most powerful, with the most extensive empire in the subcontinent. The Portuguese travellers Domingo Paes and Duarte Barbosa visited the Vijayanagara Empire during his reign, and their travelogues indicate that the king was not only an able administrator but also an excellent general, leading from the front in battle and even attending to the wounded. On many occasions, the king changed battle plans abruptly, turning a losing battle into victory. The poet Mukku Timmanna praised him as the 'Destroyer of the Turks.' Krishnadevaraya benefited from the counsel of his prime minister Timmarusu, whom he regarded as the father figure responsible for his coronation. Krishnadevaraya was also advised by the witty Tenali Ramakrishna, who was employed in his court.

Early life
Krishna Deva Raya was the son of Tuluva Narasa Nayaka and his queen Nagamamba. Tuluva Narasa Nayaka was an army commander under Saluva Narasimha Deva Raya, who later took control to prevent the disintegration of the empire and established the Tuluva dynasty of the Vijayanagara Empire.  He was married to Srirangapatna's princess Tirumala Devi and a famous and his royal dancer from Kodagu, Chinna Devi.  He was father to Tirumalamba (from Tirumala Devi), Vengalamba (from Chinna Devi) and Tirumala Raya (from Tirumala Devi). His daughters were married to Prince Rama Raya of Vijayanagara and his brother Prince Tirumala Deva Raya.

Military career
His main enemies were the Bahamani Sultans (who, though divided into five small kingdoms, remained a constant threat), the Gajapatis of Odisha, who had been involved in constant conflict since the rule of Saluva Narasimha Deva Raya, and Portugal, a rising maritime power which controlled much of the sea trade.

Success in Deccan
The raid and plunder of Vijayanagara towns and villages by the Deccan sultans came to an end during the Raya's rule. In 1509, Krishnadevaraya's armies clashed with them and Sultan Mahmud was severely injured and defeated. Yusuf Adil Shah was killed and the Raichur Doab was annexed. Taking advantage of the victory, the Raya reunited Bidar, Gulbarga, and Bijapur into Vijayanagara and earned the title "establisher of the Yavana kingdom" when he released Sultan Mahmud and made him de facto ruler. The Sultan of Golconda Sultan Quli Qutb Shah was defeated by Timmarusu, the prime minister of Sri Krishnadevaraya.

War with Kalinga
The Gajapatis of Odisha ruled a vast land comprising Bengal, Andhra region and Odisha. Krishna Deva Raya's success at Ummatur provided the necessary impetus to carry his campaign into Coastal Andhra region which was in control of the Gajapati Raja Prataparudra Deva. The Vijayanagara army laid siege to the Udayagiri fort in 1512. The campaign lasted for a year before the Gajapati army disintegrated due to starvation. Krishna Deva Raya offered prayers at Tirupati thereafter, along with his wives Tirumala Devi and Chinnama Devi. The Gajapati army was then met at Kondaveedu, where the armies of Vijayanagara, after establishing a siege for a few months, began to retreat due to heavy casualties. Then Timmarusu discovered a secret entrance to the unguarded eastern gate of the fort and launched a night attack that culminated with the capture of the fort and the imprisonment of Prince Virabhadra, the son of Prataparudra Deva. Vasireddy Mallikharjuna Nayak took over as governor of Kondaveedu thereafter.

Krishnadevaraya planned an invasion of Kalinga, but Prataparudra, learned of this plan and formulated his own plan to defeat Krishandevaraya and the Vijayanagara Empire at the fort of Kalinganagar. But the wily Timmarusu discovered Prataparudra's plan by bribing a Telugu deserter from the service of Prataparudra. When the Vijayanagara Empire did invade, Prataprudra was driven to Cuttack, the capital of the Gajapati Kingdom. Prataparudra eventually surrendered to the Vijayanagara Empire, and gave his daughter, Princess Jaganmohini, in marriage to Sri Krishnadevaraya. Krishandevaraya returned all the lands that the Vijayanagara Empire had captured north of the Krishna River; this made the Krishna river the boundary between the Vijayanagara and Gajapati Kingdoms.

Krishnadevaraya established friendly relations with the Portuguese in Goa in 1510. The Emperor obtained guns and Arabian horses from the Portuguese merchants. He also utilized Portuguese expertise to improve the water supply to Vijayanagara City.

Final conflict and death

The complicated alliances of the empire and the five Deccan sultanates meant that he was continually at war.

The highlight of his conquests occurred on 19 May 1520 where he secured Raichur Fort from Ismail Adil Shah after a difficult siege in which 16,000 Vijayanagara soldiers were killed. The exploits of the military commander, Pemmasani Ramalinga Nayudu of the Pemmasani Nayaks, during the Battle of Raichur were distinguished and lauded by Krishnadevaraya. It is said that 700,000-foot soldiers, 32,600 cavalry, and 550 elephants were used. Portuguese contingent  commanded by Cristovão de Figueiredo with the use of fireweapons help to conquer the fortress,

Krishnadevaraya was brutal towards Bahmani Generals of Raichur. Many Bahmani generals lost their lands. The other Muslim kings sent envoys to the emperor on hearing of his success and received a haughty reply.. The king conveyed that if Adil Shah would come to him, do obeisance, and kiss his foot, his lands would be restored to him. The submission never took place. Krishnadevaraya then led his army as far north as Bijapur and occupied it. He imprisoned three sons of a former king of the Bahmani dynasty, who had been held captive by the Adil Shah and he proclaimed the eldest as king of the Deccan.

Finally, in his last battle, he razed to the ground the fortress of Gulburga, the early capital of the Bahmani sultanate.

In 1524, Krishnadevaraya made his son Tirumala Raya the Yuvaraja (crown prince). The prince did not survive for long: he was poisoned. Suspecting Timmarusu, Krishna Deva Raya had him blinded. At the same time, Krishnadevaraya was preparing for an attack on Belgaum, which was in the Adil Shah's possession. Around this time, Krishnadevaraya fell ill and eventually died in 1529, succeeded by his brother, Achyuta Deva Raya.

Internal affairs

During his reign he kept strict control over his ministers, and dealt severely with any minister who committed misdeeds. He abolished obnoxious taxes such as the marriage fee. To increase revenues, he brought new lands under cultivation, ordering the deforestation of some areas and undertook a large-scale work to obtain water for irrigation around Vijayanagara. Foreign travellers such as Paes, Nunez and Barbosa who visited Vijayanagara spoke highly of the efficiency of his administration and the prosperity of the people during his reign.

The administration of the empire was carried along the lines indicated in his Amuktamalyada. He was of the opinion that the King should always rule with an eye towards Dharma. His concern for the welfare of the people is amply proved by his extensive annual tours all over the empire, during which he studied everything personally and tried to redress the grievances of the people and punish evildoers. With regard to the promotion of the economic progress of his people, Krishnadevaraya says: "the extent of the kingdom is the means for the acquisition of wealth. Therefore even if the land is limited in extent, excavate tanks and canals and increase the prosperity of the poor by leasing him the land for low ari and koru, so that you may obtain wealth as well as religious merit."

Art and literature

Krishnadevaraya was noted to be linguistically neutral as he ruled a multilingual empire. He is known to have patronised poets and issued inscriptions in languages as varied as Sanskrit, Tamil, Kannada and Telugu. Krishna Deva Raya himself was a polyglot, fluent in Sanskrit, Tamil, Kannada and Telugu. The official language of the Vijayanagara court was Kannada.

Krishnadevaraya patronized literature in various languages. The rule of Krishna Deva Raya was an age of prolific literature in many languages, although it is particularly known as a golden age of Telugu literature. Many Telugu, Kannada, Sanskrit, and Tamil poets enjoyed the patronage of the emperor, who was fluent in many languages,. The king himself composed an epic Telugu poem Amuktamalyada. His Sanskrit works include ‘Madalasa Charita’, ‘Satyavadu Parinaya’, ‘Rasamanjari’ and ‘Jambavati Kalyana’.

The Telugu poet Mukku Timmanna praised him as a great general and stated: "O Krishnaraya, you Man-Lion. You destroyed the Turks from far away with just your great name's power. Oh Lord of the elephant king, just from seeing you the multitude of elephants ran away in horror.

Telugu literature

The rule of Krishna Deva Raya is known as golden age of Telugu literature. Eight Telugu poets were regarded as eight pillars of his literary assembly and known as Ashtadiggajas. Krishna Dev Raya himself composed an epic Telugu poem Amuktamalyada.

During the reign of Krishnadevaraya Telugu culture and literature flourished and reached their heyday. The great emperor was himself a celebrated poet having composed Amuktamalyada. In his court, eight Telugu poets were regarded as the eight pillars of the literary assembly. In the olden days, it was believed that eight elephants were holding the earth in eight different directions. The title Ashtadiggajas celebrates this belief and hence the court was also called Bhuvana Vijayam (Conquest of the World). This period of the Empire is known as the "Prabandha Period," because of the quality of the prabandha literature it produced.
 Allasani Peddana is considered to be the greatest and given the title of Andhra Kavita Pitamaha (the father of Telugu poetry). Svarocisha Sambhava or Manucharita, his popular prabandha work, was dedicated to Krishnadevaraya
 Nandi Thimmana wrote Parijathapaharanam
 Madayyagari Mallana wrote Rajasekhara Charitramu
 Dhurjati wrote Kalahasti Mahatyamu
 Ayyalaraju Ramabhadrudu wrote Sakalakatha Sangraha and Ramaabhyudayamu
 Pingali Surana wrote Raghava Pandaviyamu, Kalapurnodayam and Prabhavate Pradyamana
--Raghavapandaveeyamu is a dual work with double meaning built into the text, describing both the Ramayana and the Mahabharata.
--Kalapurnodayam ("full bloom of art") has been considered the first original poetic novel in Telugu literature
 Battumurthy, alias Ramarajabhushanudu, wrote Kavyalankarasangrahamu, Vasucharitra, Narasabhupaliyam and Harischandranalopakhyanamu, a dual work which tells simultaneously the story of King Harishchandra and Nala and Damayanti
 Tenali Ramakrishna first wrote Udbhataradhya Charitramu, a Shaivite work. However, he later converted to Vaishnavism and wrote the Vaishnava devotional texts Panduranga Mahatmyamu, and Ghatikachala Mahatmyamu. Tenali Rama remains one of the most popular folk figures in India today, a quick-witted courtier ready even to outwit the all-powerful emperor.

Other well-known poets were Sankusala Nrisimha Kavi, who wrote Kavikarna Rasayana, Chintalapudi Ellaya, who wrote Radhamadhavavilasa and Vishnumayavilasa, the poet Molla, who wrote a version of the Ramayana, Kamsali Rudrakavi, who wrote Nirankusopakhyana, and Addamki Gangadhara, who wrote Tapatlsamvarana and Basavapurana. Manumanchi Bhatta wrote a scientific work on veterinary science called Haya lakshanasara.

Kannada literature
He patronised the Kannada poet Mallanarya, who wrote Veera-shaivamruta, Bhava-chinta-ratna and Satyendra Chola-kathe, Chatu Vittalanatha who wrote Bhagavatha''' and Timmanna Kavi, who wrote a eulogy of his king in Krishna Raya Bharata.Prof K.A.N. Sastri, History of South India pp 355-366 Vyasatirtha, the great Dvaita saint from Mysore of the Madhva tradition was his Rajaguru. Krishna Deva Rayana Dinachari in Kannada is a recently discovered work. The record highlights the contemporary society during Krishna Deva Raya's time in his personal diary. However, it is not yet clear if the record was written by the king himself.

Purandara Dasa explored the Madhwa philosophy and the Rajaguru of Krishnadevaraya, emperor of the Vijayanagara Empire. According to Prof. Sambamoorthy, Srinivasa had his formal initiation at the hands of Vyasatirtha in 1525 when he was about 40 years old, with the name Purandara Daasa bestowed on him.  Purandara Daasa traveled extensively through the length and breadth of the Vijayanagara Empire and Pandharapur in Maharashtra composing and rendering soul-stirring songs in praise of God. He spent his last years in Hampi and also sang songs in Krishnadevaraya's court.

Tamil literature

Krishna Deva Raya patronised the Tamil poet Haridasa, and Tamil literature soon began to flourish as the years passed by.

Sanskrit literature
In Sanskrit, Vyasatirtha wrote Bhedo-jjivana, Tat-parya-chandrika, Nyaya-mrita (a work directed against the Advaita philosophy) and Tarka-tandava. Krishna Deva Raya, himself an accomplished scholar, wrote Madalasa Charita, Satyavadu Parinaya and Rasamanjari and Jambavati Kalyana.Prof K.A.N. Sastri, History of South India pg.239-280

Religion and culture

Krishna Deva Raya respected all sects of Hinduism. He is known to have encouraged and supported various sects and their places of worship. He rebuilt the Virupaksha Temple and other Shiva shrines. He gave land grants to the temples of Tirumala, Srisailam, Amaravati, Chidambaram, Ahobilam, and Tiruvannamalai. He lavished on the Tirumala Venkateswara Temple numerous objects of priceless value, ranging from diamond studded crowns to golden swords to nine kinds of precious gems. Krishna Deva Raya made Venkateshwara his patron deity. He visited the temple seven times. Out of the around 1,250 temple epigraphs published by the Tirumala Devasthanam, 229 are attributed to Krishna Deva Raya. A statue of Krishna Deva Raya with two of his wives is found at the temple complex of Tirumala. These statues are still visible at the temple at the exit. He also contributed in building parts of the Srisailam temple complex where he had rows of mandapas built.

Krishna Deva Raya himself was formally initiated into the Sri Vaishnava Sampradaya. He wrote a Telugu work on Andal, a Tamil Sri Vaishnava female saint, called the Amuktamalyada. Venkata Tathacharya of the Sri Vaishnava sect was Krishna Deva Raya's Rajguru, and he was considered influential. The Madhwa text Vyasayogicarita claims that the Madhwa seer Vyasatirtha was the Kulguru of Krishna Deva Raya. However, given the lack of supporting epigraphical evidence, this claim has been argued as "hyperbolic."

 See also 
 Vijayanagara Sri Krishnadevaraya University
 Sri Krishnadevaraya University
 History of Tirumala Venkateswara Temple

References

 Sources 

 Smith, Vincent, Oxford History of India, Fourth Edition, pgs. 306–307, and 312–313.
 Dr. Suryanath U. Kamat, Concise history of Karnataka, 2001, MCC, Bangalore (Reprinted 2002).
 Prof K.A. Nilakanta Sastri, History of South India, From Prehistoric times to fall of Vijayanagar, 1955, OUP, New Delhi (Reprinted 2002)

External links

 The Golden Era of Telugu Literature from the Vepachedu Educational Foundation
 Krishnadevaraya's complex at Tirupati
 Statues of Krishnadevaraya and his wives at Tirupati.
 Gold coins issued during Krishnadevaraya's reign
 A Forgotten Empire (Vijayanagara): a contribution to the history of India (Translation of the Chronica dos reis de Bisnaga'' written by Domingos Paes and Fernão Nunes about 1520 and 1535, respectively, with a historical introduction by Robert Sewell)

Indian monarchs
People of the Vijayanagara Empire
People from Karnataka
History of Karnataka
1529 deaths
Indian Hindus
Hindu monarchs
Culture of Andhra Pradesh
16th-century Indian monarchs
Indian military leaders
Vijayanagara poets
1471 births